Sidi Khalifa is a Basic People's Congress administrative division of Benghazi, Libya.

References

See also 
 List of cities in Libya

Basic People's Congress divisions of Benghazi